Chris O'Neil or O'Neill may refer to:

 Chris O'Neil (tennis) (born 1956), Australian female tennis player
 Chris O'Neil (footballer) (born 1995), Scottish footballer
Chris O'Neill (YouTuber) (born 1990), Irish animator and Internet personality
Christopher O'Neill (born 1974), husband of Princess Madeleine of Sweden
 Christopher John O'Neill, American comedian and Broadway actor

See also 
 Chris O'Neal (born 1994), American actor